Chastity device may refer to:

 Chastity belt
 Chastity belt (BDSM)
 Chastity piercing